Kinlochiel is a hamlet on the north west shore of Loch Eil in Lochaber, Scottish Highlands and is in the Scottish council area of Highland. It is a small, rural area that consists of a few scattered houses on the A830 to Mallaig, after Fassfern and before Glenfinnan.

References

Populated places in Lochaber